The Chałubińskiego 8 (formerly known as Elektrim and INTRACO II, then Oxford Tower) is a skyscraper located in Warsaw on 8 Chałubiński Street next to the Centrum LIM skyscraper.

It was constructed from 1975 to 1978, from the design of Jerzy Skrzypczak, H. Świergocka-Kaim, and Wojciech Grzybowski. The skyscraper is a blue-white building whose styling was designed and constructed to appeal to an international audience. A similar second building, called Intraco I, was built a few years earlier and is located at Stawki Street.

The Oxford Tower building was one of the first, along with the Forum Hotel (now the Novotel Warszawa Centrum) and Intraco 1, of several skyscrapers in Warsaw. The skyscraper is part of the so-called Center West; built in order to hide, and therefore weaken, the dominance of the pre-existing Palace of Culture and Science. The Oxford Tower consists of Class B office space which houses offices of companies such as Citibank Handlowy, Minex, Grappahl, Polservice, and AV investor Polferries. The headquarters of Elektrim was formerly housed in this building.

See also
 List of tallest buildings in Poland

References 

Śródmieście, Warsaw
Skyscraper office buildings in Warsaw

Office buildings completed in 1978